= Constituency RSM-167 =

Reserved constituency of the Provincial Assembly of Sindh, Pakistan

RSM-167
- Provincial Reserved constituency for the Provincial Assembly of Sindh

Current constituency

RSM-167 is a reserved Constituency of the Provincial Assembly of Sindh, Pakistan. It is currently held by Diwan Chand Chawla

== See also ==
- Sindh
